Päevaleht was a newspaper published from 1905 until 1940 in Estonia.

History and profile
The first issue of Päevaleht was published on 16 December 1905 in Tallinn. In 1924, they expanded to a new building.

Following the Soviet occupation, the newspaper was replaced by Noorte Hääl (published 1940–1941 and 1944–1990) in 1940. The last regular issue was printed on 26 July 1940. During the German occupation of Estonia in World War II, a revival of the old newspaper was attempted, but only a single issue was able to appear on August 29, 1941.

On 1 February 1990, the newspaper Noorte Hääl became Päevaleht once again.

The paper was digitized by the National Library of Estonia.

See also
 Päevaleht
 Eesti Päevaleht

References

1905 establishments in the Russian Empire
1940s disestablishments in Estonia
Publications established in 1905
Publications disestablished in 1940
Newspapers published in Estonia
Defunct newspapers published in Estonia
Estonian-language newspapers
Mass media in Tallinn